Elvin G. Nimrod (27 August 1943 – 6 February 2021) was a politician from the island of Carriacou.  He served in the House of Representatives of Grenada as Parliamentary Representative for Carriacou and Petite Martinique, and has in the past served as Deputy Prime Minister, and Minister of Foreign Affairs, International Trade, Legal Affairs, Labour, Local Government, Carriacou and Petite Martinique Affairs and Attorney General.

Nimrod attended the Hillsborough Government School in Carriacou, then later the Grenada Boys Secondary School.

Elvin later migrated to the United States, where he attended Brooklyn College, receiving a Bachelor of Science degree in political science.  He then attended the John Jay College of Criminal Justice, where he obtained a Master of Arts degree in criminal justice. He culminated his academic pursuits by attending New York Law School, where he obtained a Juris Doctor (JD) degree.

After a number of years practising law in New York and Grenada, he entered the Grenada political arena in 1997, when he became a member of the Senate. Two years later, in 1999, he was elected on a New National Party ticket, becoming the Parliamentary Representative for Carriacou and Petite Martinique—a designation he held until his retirement from frontline politics just before the 2018 general elections in Grenada.

See also
List of foreign ministers in 2017

References
Interview with Nimrod
Another article
Book of Condolences

1943 births
Living people
Ministers of Carriacou and Petite Martinique Affairs
Members of the House of Representatives of Grenada
New National Party (Grenada) politicians
Foreign ministers of Grenada
Deputy Prime Ministers of Grenada
Trade ministers of Grenada
Justice ministers of Grenada
Labour ministers of Grenada
Carriacouan politicians
Attorneys General of Grenada
20th-century Grenadian lawyers
Brooklyn College alumni
20th-century Grenadian politicians
21st-century Grenadian politicians